Icon Productions is a production company founded in August 1989 by actor/director Mel Gibson and Australian producing partner Bruce Davey, which, unlike most other independent production companies, funds most of its development and production costs, allowing it to retain creative control of its projects. Its headquarters are in Santa Monica, California.

In 2008–2009, the company's UK operations were sold. After the acquisition of Dendy Cinemas, a separate company involved in film distribution only in Australia continued to operate as Icon Film Distribution, using the original logo and still owned by Gibson and Davey.

History 

Icon started when Gibson was having trouble in financing the 1990 film Hamlet. According to Davey: 

Unlike most other independents, Icon has always financed most of its development and packaging costs internally, mainly by Gibson, allowing it to retain creative control of projects through production. Felicia's Journey director Atom Egoyan praised the company's creative independence and risk-taking: 

Gibson has explained that the company's name was chosen because icon means "image" in Greek, and that the inspiration came from a book on Russian icons in his den. The logo's artwork originally features a sketch of Michael the Archangel in 1993, but now features a small crop of the mother's left eye from the Theotokos of Vladimir icon, an Eastern Orthodox icon of Mary, mother of God.

The company also produced films in the UK and Australia and distributed cinema films through its British subsidiary and its Australian subsidiary. It also owned a library of over 250 film titles.
After the financial success of The Passion of the Christ, there was frequent mention of the ability of Icon to function as a mini-studio. However, Bruce Davey downplayed those expectations, saying, "The last thing we want is to become a studio. We don't want to become that top heavy. We want to be independent and passionate. We don't want to lose the magic".

The main executives at Icon were Mel Gibson (president), Bruce Davey (chairman of the board of directors) and Mark Gooder (CEO).

2008–2009 changes 
In early 2008, Icon entered the exhibition business for the first time by purchasing Dendy Cinemas, Australia's largest independent film distributor and art house cinema chain.

In September 2008, Davey and Gibson started negotiations for the sale of the Icon international sales and film distribution arms along with the Majestic library. UK operations were sold to US-based industrial group Access Industries (founded by Leonard Blavatnik), with former UK Film Council chairman Stewart Till as new CEO and equity holder in the business. The new company would continue to use the Icon name and would have a three-year first-look deal with Icon Productions to handle the international rights to its productions. The sale was completed in November 2009. The deal included Icon’s international sales company, the distribution operation based in the UK, and the Majestic Films & Television library, but not the Los Angeles operation Icon Productions LLC, which Gibson still owned outright with Davey, who relocated to Australia, nor the Dendy Cinemas were part of the acquisition deal.

Current US operation 
As at June 2018, Gibson and Davey were still running Icon Productions LLC. The company had sued the producer of their film The Professor and the Madman for breach of contract, but on 19 June 2018, Judge Ruth Kwan of the Los Angeles County Superior Court did not allow this, saying that there was not enough evidence.

Australia 
The 2008–2009 transaction did not include the Australian distribution company and cinemas, which remains as Icon Film Distribution as of February 2019.

UK 
In November 2011, Icon announced it was closing its UK distribution wing to focus on financing and producing films, with Lionsgate taking over distribution and was said to be in talks to buy its back catalogue. In late 2012, Icon UK re-acquired the Producers Sales Organization library from Lionsgate. In 2013, it was announced that Icon UK could get backing from film fund Prescience. Earlier, the unit hired Exclusive Media (later AMBI Group) to represent its library. In September 2013, Icon Film Distribution UK was purchased by investment company New Sparta.

In September 2017, after a strings of box office bombs back in 2016, Icon Film Distribution UK was put up for sale by New Sparta. In March 2018, Icon Film Distribution UK was acquired by Kaleidoscope Film Distribution.

Films 
 Hamlet (1990)
 Forever Young (1992)
 Airborne (1993)
 The Man Without a Face (1993)
 Immortal Beloved (1994)
 Maverick (1994)
 Braveheart (1995) (co-production with The Ladd Company, distributed by Paramount Pictures in North America and 20th Century Fox in international territories)
 Dad and Dave: On Our Selection (1995)
 One Eight Seven (1997)
 Anna Karenina (1997)
 FairyTale: A True Story (1997)
 Felicia's Journey (1999)
 An Ideal Husband (1999)
 Payback (1999)
 Ordinary Decent Criminal (2000)
 Bless the Child (2000)
 Kevin & Perry Go Large (2000)
 The Magic Pudding (2000)
 The Million Dollar Hotel (2000)
 The Miracle Maker (2000) (as Icon Entertainment International) (with the participation of)
 Thomas and the Magic Railroad (July 14, 2000) (Released in United Kingdom)
 What Women Want (2000)
 Ghost World (2001)
 Sweet Sixteen (2002)
 We Were Soldiers (2002)
 The Singing Detective (2003)
 Paparazzi (2004)
 The Passion of the Christ (2004)
 Romance & Cigarettes (2005) (as Icon Entertainment International) (in association with)
 Seraphim Falls (2006)
 Apocalypto (2006)
 Black Sheep (2006)
 Butterfly on a Wheel (2007)
 Mr. Magorium's Wonder Emporium (2007) (UK and Ireland distribution only) (Released in United Kingdom)
 The Black Balloon (2008) (as Icon Entertainment International) (presents)
 Dragon Hunters (2008) (as Icon Entertainment International) (UK home video only)
 Hunger (2008)
 Infestation (2009)
 Mary and Max (2009)
 Nowhere Boy (2009)
 Push (2009)
 Black Dynamite (2009)
 Triangle (2009) (as Icon Entertainment International)
 Buried (2010)
 Edge of Darkness (2010)
 The Way (2010)
 Coriolanus (2011)
 Get the Gringo (2012)
 Upside Down (2012) (UK and Ireland home video distribution only)
 You're Next (2013) (international distribution only)
 Postman Pat: The Movie (2014)
 Stonehearst Asylum (2014)
 Mr. Holmes (2015)
 The Neon Demon (2016)
 The Nice Guys (2016) (UK and Ireland distribution only)
 Road Games (2016) (UK and Ireland distribution only)
 City of Tiny Lights (2016) (UK and Ireland distribution only)
  Handsome Devil  (2016)
 Hacksaw Ridge (2016)
 Finding Fatimah (2017)
 The Jungle Bunch (2017) 
 Hotel Mumbai  (2018)  (Australian distribution only) 
 The Professor and the Madman (2019)
 Nowhere Special (2020)
 Hive (2021)
 To Olivia (2021)
 Lethal Finale (TBA)
 The Passion of the Christ: Resurrection (2025)

Television 
 Clubhouse (2004 TV series) (in association with Spelling Television)
 Complete Savages (2004 TV series) (in association with Nothing Can Go Wrong Now Productions and Universal Network Television)
 Evel Knievel (2004 TV movie) (in association with Jaffe/Braunstein Films and Turner Network Television)
 Kevin Hill (2004 TV series) (in association with O'Taye Productions and Touchstone Television)
 Carrier (2008 TV series) (with Carrier Project)

References

External links 
 Icon Film Distribution (Australia only)
 Dendy Cinemas Official site

 
Film production companies of the United States
Film distributors of the United States
Mass media companies established in 1989
Companies based in Los Angeles
1989 establishments in California
Mel Gibson
American independent film studios